[[File:True Katydid Pterophylla camellifolia.jpg|thumb|alt=Pterophylla camellifolia|Common true katydid nymph on a Mirabilis jalapa flower]]Pterophylla camellifolia, the common true katydid, is a common North American insect in the family Tettigoniidae (katydids). Within the Tettigoniidae, it belongs to the subfamily Pseudophyllinae (true katydids). Other common names include northern true katydid and rough-winged katydid.

The loud, rasping, three-pulsed song, rendered "ka-ty-did", of the male of the nominate northern subspecies is the source of the vernacular name "katydid” as applied to any tettigoniid. It is a nearly flightless species that, in contrast with other katydids, often walks, runs, or hops rather than leaping or flying. It lives in the canopy of deciduous trees, where it feeds on the foliage.

Song
The singing rate is temperature dependent.
Four populations of this species can be distinguished by song characteristics:

The two-, three-, or four-pulsed song of northern populations, as described above;
 The faster song with more pulses per phrase, often heard in large, synchronized choruses common to the Southeastern populations;
 The one- or two-pulsed song of Southwestern populations; and
 A song of 8 to 15 pulses heard only in central Iowa.

Taxonomy
This species' original scientific name was Locusta camellifolia. The genus Pterophylla was created for it by Kirby in 1825. Three subspecies are recognized for P. camellifolia:

 Pterophylla camellifolia camellifolia (Fabricius, 1775) – type locality is in the United States
 Pterophylla camellifolia dentifera (Hebard, 1941) – type locality is Hempstead County, Arkansas, United States
 Pterophylla camellifolia intermedia'' (Caudell, 1906) – type locality is Biloxi, Mississippi, United States

References

Pseudophyllinae
Insects described in 1775
Taxa named by Johan Christian Fabricius